Huang Lu (born July 10, 1983) is a Chinese actress. A graduate of the Beijing Film Academy, Huang debuted in director Li Yang's Blind Mountain, where she played a young college student sold into sexual slavery in a mountain village in northern China.

She has since acted in Cai Shangjun's The Red Awn in a supporting role.

Filmography

Film

Television

Producer

References

External links 
 
 Huang Lu at the Chinese Movie Database
 

Chinese film actresses
Beijing Film Academy alumni
1983 births
21st-century Chinese actresses
Living people
Actresses from Chengdu